Dongpu Station is a station on Line 5 of the Guangzhou Metro. It is located underground Huangpu Avenue East to the west of the Guangzhou Ring Road Expressway in the Tianhe District. It opened on 28December 2009.

Station layout

Exits

References

Railway stations in China opened in 2009
Guangzhou Metro stations in Tianhe District